Manora is a town in Washim district, Maharashtra state, India. Nearby are other towns such as Waigaul, Poharadevi, and Asola; they are all religious villages. Manora is situated on the bank of the river named as Arunavati River. It is a central town for nearby villages. All major administrative offices are situated in this town. This town is governed by Nagar Panchayat.

Banjara community forms a sizable population of the region. People from far-off places visit a village of Manora taluka known as Pwradevi or Poharadevi  to worship Sevalal Maharaj, the lord of the Banjara community.

As far as education is concerned, in Manora, there are many colleges of various studies. We can find a senior college and one ITI college in Manora. 
 
Manora is also known for its bustling market. Manora is a small taluka place, but a large number of small villages are well connected with it. This is the main reason behind Manora's crowded market. In Manora, all big and small offices are located, so everybody has to come to Manora for every official work. Manora is life-line for the farmers, many agro shops are nice working in this village, farmers can easily sell their farm products in Manora.

As far as religious places are concerned, there are many Hindu temples in the vicinity of Manora town, there are four to five masjids as well. During festive seasons Manorian  decorates nook and corner of the town with rangolis and lights.
Manora is parted into many areas such as Juni Basti, Rathi Nagar, Vasant Nagar, Madina Nagar, Ramai Nagar and many other areas. Juni Basti is the oldest part of Manora. This part is situated on the bank of The river Arunavati. In this part of town people of various religious beliefs live happily together.

Wednesday is the Bazar Day of Manora, people from nearby villages come to purchase their required things for the whole week. In Bazar Day, traders from the other cities also come for the trade. The speciality of the  Manora's Bazar day, that we get fresh, leafy vegetables to spicy meat and delicious fishes are found in  ample quantity. In the entire week, Manorian have fresh vegetables on the table, the reason behind this, the majority of vegetables come from nearby farms.

References

Cities and towns in Washim district